Jeremiah J. Murphy (February 2, 1858 – May 12, 1932), was a United States Army soldier who received the Medal of Honor. His award came for gallantry during the American Indian Wars.

Early life
Jeremiah J. Murphy was born on February 2, 1858, in County Cork, Ireland. Before he was 18, he immigrated to the United States.

Career
Murphy enlisted into the U.S. Army in Boston, Massachusetts on February 13, 1875, just eleven days after his eighteenth birthday, which was the minimal age for enlistment. Murphy was assigned to Company F, of the 3rd United States Cavalry Regiment. He was 19 years of age in March 1876, when he fought at the Battle of Powder River, Montana Territory on March 17, 1876. There, he attempted to rescue a badly wounded fellow 3rd Cavalry soldier, Private Lorenzo E. Ayers of Company M. Three months after the Powder River battle, on June 17, 1876, he fought in the Battle of the Rosebud, Montana Territory. On October 16, 1877, Murphy was awarded the Medal of Honor at Camp Sheridan, Nebraska, for his actions at Powder River.

Death

Jeremiah J. Murphy died on May 12, 1932, in Detroit, Michigan, where his daughter Elizabeth resided. He is interred at Mount Olivet Cemetery in Washington, D.C.

Medal of Honor citation
Rank and organization: Saddler Private, 3rd United States Cavalry. Place and date: At Powder River, Montana, March 17, 1876. Entered service at: Boston, Massachusetts, United States. Born: February 2, 1852, County Cork, Ireland. Date of issue: October 16, 1877.

Citation:

"Being the only member of his picket not disabled, he attempted to save a wounded comrade".

See also
 List of Medal of Honor recipients for the Indian Wars
 Battle of Powder River
 Battle of the Rosebud

References

 Michigan Death Records 1867–1950. 932

External links

1858 births
1932 deaths
American Indian Wars recipients of the Medal of Honor
Irish emigrants to the United States (before 1923)
Irish-born Medal of Honor recipients
People from County Cork
United States Army Medal of Honor recipients
United States Army soldiers
Burials at Mount Olivet Cemetery (Washington, D.C.)